The Tramway Museum Society of Victoria Incorporated (TMSV) owns a large collection of trams from Melbourne, Ballarat, Geelong, Adelaide, and Sydney as well as preserved buses and other work vehicles.

History

The TMSV was founded in 1962 with the aim of establishing an operational tramway museum. It was believed at this time that Melbourne would follow the other tram systems in Australia and abandon its tram system, which was one of the main reasons for founding the museum. In 1970, the former Station Masters residence on the now closed Bylands railway station situated on the Heathcote Junction to Bendigo railway line, was purchased.  The surrounding railway precinct was leased the following year to with the goal to establish a "transport museum".  The lease was purchased outright in the mid-1980s.

The museum has  of electric track, which was previously a part of the Heathcote Junction to Bendigo railway line. The museum initially operated a horse tramway, utilising restored and recreated horse tramway carriages. Electric tram services commenced in the mid 1980's and operated until 2009. The Tramway Heritage Centre currently operates as a static museum.

The Tramway Heritage Centre has a tramway electric supply substation, two running sheds, an exhibition shed/workshop - that was used as part of the Melbourne International Exhibition of 1880, various buildings for the storage of un-restored trams, cable tram cars, motor vehicles and a visitors centre.

List of trams
MMTB Trams

L 101,
W 220,
W1 427,
W2 509,
W2 568,
W2 643,
SW2 644,
W2 646,
W2 650,
W3 667,
W4 673,
SW5 739,
W5 782,
W5 795,
SW5 840,
SW6 887,
SW6 902,
W6 996,
W7 1001,
X1 467,
X2 680,
Y 612,
Z1 5,
PCC 980,
Malcolm tram from the movie Malcolm

MMTB works trams 

Grinder 1,
Bogie tank car 7,
Scrubber car 10 (Ex Sydney K 763),
Sleeper transport car 15 (Ex Q class 198),
Ballast trailer 24

Other Victorian Trams

Prahran & Malvern No. 46,
Victorian Railways No.34,
Victorian Railways No.52,
Ballarat 17,
Ballarat 23,
Ballarat 36,
Geelong 9,
Geelong 22,
Geelong 40

Interstate trams

Adelaide H 368,
Adelaide H 373,
Sydney R 1845,

Publications
The Tramway Museum Society of Victoria publishes a quarterly newsletter, Running Journal.

References

External links

Tramway Museum Society of Victoria website

Heritage railways in Australia
Trams in Melbourne
Light rail in Australia
Tram transport in Australia
1962 establishments in Australia
Railway museums in Victoria (Australia)
Shire of Mitchell